Brett A Lummis (c.1978-1980) is a male former international backstroke swimmer from England.

Swimming career
Lummis became a British champion after winning the ASA National British Championships over 50 metres backstroke in 2000.

Lummis represented England in the 200 metres individual medley event, at the 1998 Commonwealth Games in Kuala Lumpur, Malaysia.

References

1976 births
Living people
Male backstroke swimmers
English male swimmers
Swimmers at the 1998 Commonwealth Games
Commonwealth Games competitors for England